The Albanian Revolt may refer to:
The Albanian Revolt of 1432–36
The Albanian Revolts of 1833–39
The Albanian Revolt of 1843–44
The Albanian revolt of 1845
The Albanian Revolt of 1847
The Albanian Revolt of 1910
The Albanian Revolt of 1911
The Albanian Revolt of 1912
The Peasant Revolt in Albania
The Fall of communism in Albania
The Albanian Rebellion of 1997